Callaghan is a new neighbourhood in southwest Edmonton, Alberta, Canada.  It is bounded on the south by 30 Avenue SW and on the east by James Mowatt Trail (111 Street) and the Blackmud Creek Ravine.  The north boundary is approximately 21 Avenue SW.

Demographics 
In the City of Edmonton's 2012 municipal census, Callaghan had a population of  living in  dwellings.

Surrounding neighbourhoods

References 

Neighbourhoods in Edmonton